Parasomnia is an independent horror film directed by William Malone and starring Jeffrey Combs, Timothy Bottoms, Sean Young, and Dylan Purcell. The filming was funded by Malone himself, and its release was delayed due to difficulties securing distribution.

Plot 
Danny Sloan is an art student who works in a record shop. He visits his friend Billy (Dov Tiefenbach), who is in drug rehab in hospital. Billy suggests Danny goes to see the "psycho ward" before he leaves, to see Byron Volpe (Patrick Kilpatrick), a serial killer kept in a padded cell after being convicted of murdering his wife Madeline (Sean Young) by hypnotizing her into jumping from a building. Volpe is explained to have extraordinary powers of hypnotism, and is kept restrained and hooded to stop hospital staff from seeing his eyes. During the visit, Danny sees Laura Baxter (Cherilyn Wilson) sleeping in the room next to Volpe. She suffers from a form of parasomnia in which she sleeps most of the time, and wakes occasionally for short periods of time.

Danny falls in love with Laura, and continues to visit her at the hospital. When he finds out that she is due to move to a clinic run by Dr. Bhyle (Louis Graham) where she will be used for medical experimentation, he resolves to rescue her. Disguised as a doctor from the Bhyle clinic, he kidnaps her and takes her to his apartment. The following morning Danny discovers that a neighbor has been murdered, and Laura attacks him with a knife while seemingly in a trance. When Detective Conroy, investigating the neighbor's death, comes to Danny's apartment, Laura kills him. Danny decides that Volpe must be controlling her, and decides that he must kill Volpe to stop him. He buys a handgun and visits the hospital, but Volpe overpowers him, escapes and takes Laura. Danny visits Volpe's derelict book shop, where Detective Garrett (Jeffrey Combs) finds him. After Volpe speaks to Garrett on the phone, he too falls under Volpe's control and takes Danny to Volpe. Volpe then sets Garrett to repeatedly playing Russian roulette.

Volpe explains to Danny that rather than just kill him, he must make Laura forget about Danny so that she will love only Volpe. Volpe hypnotizes Danny into denouncing his love for Laura, but the sound of a gunshot made by Garrett shooting himself breaks the spell, and Danny and Laura fight and finally defeat Volpe. Garrett, who was only wounded by the gunshot, then shoots Danny in the side of the head, rendering him comatose. The film ends with Danny and Laura being cared for together by Dr. Corso (Timothy Bottoms) back at the hospital.

Cast

Production 
Malone wrote the screenplay while he was working on the Masters of Horror episode "Fair-Haired Child". The film was financed by Malone and his friends, and filmed on the same stage on which he directed House on Haunted Hill (1999). The imagery in the film was inspired by surrealist artist Zdzisław Beksiński.

Release
It premiered on October 17, 2008 at Screamfest Film Festival in the United States. E1 Entertainment released the film on DVD and Blu-ray Disc on July 13, 2010.

References

External links 
 
 
  
 

American supernatural horror films
2008 films
Films directed by William Malone
Films scored by Nicholas Pike
2008 horror films
2000s English-language films
2000s American films